Chi Eta Phi Sorority, Inc. is an international, nonprofit,  professional service organization for registered professional nurses and student nurses, representing many cultures and diverse ethnic backgrounds. The Sorority has more than 8000 members located throughout the United States, the District of Columbia, Saint Thomas, U.S. Virgin Islands, and Monrovia, Liberia. Dr. Sarah Killian, DNP, RN is the current  National President.

History
Chi Eta Phi Sorority, Inc., was founded on October 16, 1932, at Freedman's Hospital in Washington D.C., now known as Howard University Hospital. The organization's foundation was based on concerns, at that time, which regarded restrictions in the employment of black nurses to segregated facilities and hospitals, and menial positions where there was little to no chance of advancement in the profession.

The charter chapter, Alpha, was founded and organized by Ailene Carrington Ewell, RN, with the assistance of 11 other courageous black registered nurses, collectively known as "The Twelve Jewels": Clara E. Beverly, Lillian Mosely Boswell, Gladys Louise Catchings, Bessie Foster Cephas, Henrietta Smith Chisholm, Susan Elizabeth Freeman, Ruth Turner Garrett, Olivia Larkins Howard, Mildred Wood Lucas, Clara Belle Royster, and Katherine Chandler Turner.

Programs
The organization has programs focusing on health promotion/disease prevention, leadership development, mentoring, recruitment, retention and scholarship. These programs include national, regional, and local conferences, seminars, and workshops; consumer health education programs throughout different  communities; leadership development programs/summits that focus on continuing education; recruitment and retention of nursing students; and award recognition of outstanding nurses in the profession.
The organization has relationships with many civic, professional, and educational groups including the American Nurses' Association, the National Council of Negro Women, the United Negro College Fund, the National Association for the Advancement of Colored People, the Sickle Cell Disease Association of America, the American Cancer Society, the National Cancer Institute, and the National Institute on Drug Abuse.

Publications
Chi Eta Phi has several publications including:

Chi Line, National Newsletter (Semi-annual publication)
Glowing Lamp, Journal of Chi Eta Phi Sorority (Annual Publication/Peer Reviewed/Evidence-based/Nursing research journal)
Mary Eliza Mahoney, America's First Black Professional Nurse
The Nurse in the Kitchen

Chapters
The graduate and undergraduate (Beta) chapters are grouped into five regions according to geographic areas. There are over 101 graduate chapters and 41 undergraduate chapters located in 33 states, Washington, D.C., St. Thomas, US Virgin Islands, and Monrovia, Liberia. Membership is by invitation and is both active and honorary.

References 

Student organizations established in 1932
Professional fraternities and sororities in the United States
1932 establishments in Washington, D.C.